Matthias Gross (German spelling: Groß, pronounced , ; born 1969) is a German sociologist and science studies scholar. He currently is Full Professor of Environmental Sociology at the University of Jena, and by joint appointment, at Helmholtz Centre for Environmental Research – UFZ in Leipzig, Germany.

Gross received a PhD in sociology from Bielefeld University in 2001. Between 2002 and 2005 he co-directed the research group “Real World Experiments” at the Institute of Science and Technology Studies at Bielefeld University and from 2005 to 2013 he was senior research scientist at the Helmholtz Centre in Leipzig. He held research positions and visiting professorships at the University of Wisconsin, Madison, Loyola University Chicago, and the Martin Luther University of Halle, Germany. He is co-editor of the interdisciplinary journal Nature + Culture. Between 2006 and 2018 he was chair of the German Sociological Association's Section on Environmental sociology and from 2011 to 2019 he was chair of the European Sociological Association's Research Network on Environment and Society. In 2013 he has won the Sage Prize for Innovation and Excellence from the British Sociological Association for his paper on Georg Simmel and nonknowledge and in 2018 the Frederick H. Buttel Prize of the International Sociological Association (ISA)

Selected books

References

External links 
 Personal Homepage at the University of Jena
 Homepage at Helmholtz Centre for Environmental Research in Leipzig
 Sociology of Ignorance Website

1969 births
Living people
German sociologists
Academic staff of the University of Jena
Environmental sociologists
Academic journal editors
German male writers
Sociologists of science